The Shakespeare is a Grade II listed public house at 1 Glynne Street, Farnworth, Greater Manchester BL4 7DN.

It is on the Campaign for Real Ale's National Inventory of Historic Pub Interiors.

It was built in 1926 for Magee Marshall, Brewer, of Bolton.

References

Grade II listed pubs in Greater Manchester
Grade II listed buildings in the Metropolitan Borough of Bolton
National Inventory Pubs
Farnworth